Um El Faroud was a  Libyan-owned single screw motor tanker. Following a gas explosion during maintenance work on 3 February 1995, she was scuttled off the coast of Malta as an artificial reef and diving attraction.

History

The ship was built in 1969 at Smith Dock Co. Ltd, Middlesbrough, England and was owned by the General National Maritime Transport Company, Tripoli (GNMTC). She had been operating between Italy and Libya carrying refined fuel up to 1 February 1995. On 3 February 1995 she was docked at No.3 Dock of Malta dry docks. During the night of 3 February an explosion occurred in No.3 centre tank, killing nine shipyard workers. The vessel suffered structural deformation and, following inspection and survey, was considered a total write-off. She occupied the dock in the harbor of Valletta for three years until 1998, when it was decided that the best option to utilize her remaining value was to tow her to sea and scuttle her as an artificial reef.

Diving
The wreck sits upright on the sandy seabed southwest of Wied il-Qrendi. The bottom rests at 36 metres. After a bad storm during the winter of 2005/6 the ship has now broken in two.

Wreck penetration is possible with access to both the engine room and several of the smaller surrounding rooms in the stern section and parts of the mid and forward storage sections of the ship.

While the wreck is still relatively new, it has quickly become popular with fish, including pelagic species such as tuna, jacks, and barracuda. Scuba divers might come across some squid and barracudas at the stern.

References 

Wreck diving sites
Shipwrecks of Malta
Ships sunk as dive sites
1969 ships
Ships of Libya
Underwater diving sites in Malta
Qrendi
1995 in Malta
Ships sunk as artificial reefs
Maritime incidents in 1998
Explosions in Malta